A supporting electrolyte, in electrochemistry, according to an IUPAC definition, is an electrolyte containing chemical species that are not electroactive (within the range of potentials used) and which has an ionic strength and conductivity much larger than those due to the electroactive species added to the electrolyte. Supporting electrolyte is also sometimes referred to as inert electrolyte or inactive electrolyte.

Supporting electrolytes are widely used in electrochemical measurements when control of electrode potentials is required. This is done to increase the conductivity of the solution (to practically eliminate the so-called IR drop), to eliminate the transport of electroactive species by ion migration in the electric field, to maintain constant ionic strength, to maintain constant pH, etc.

References 

Electrolytes